Abdullah bin Muhammad bin Rashid Al Khalifa (born 1960) is a Bahraini member of the House of Khalifa and between 2013 and 2017 was Bahraini Ambassador in Washington, D.C. The current Ambassador is Abdullah Bin Rashid Al Khalifa

Career
In 1988 he entered the Royal Bahraini Air Force and was trained as a fighter pilot.
He flew the Northrop F-5 and General Dynamics F-16 Fighting Falcon.
In 1990 he received the best fighter pilot award from the Royal Air Force College Cranwell.
From 1990 to 1991 he participated in the Gulf War.
From 1997 to 2003 he earned a Bachelor's Degree and an MBA from Bentley University.
From 2003 to 2005, during the Iraq War he was mission commander flying over Kuwait.
He participated in 25 military and leadership courses in the Kingdom of Bahrain, Kuwait, the United States and the United Kingdom.
From 2005 to 2013 he was defense, military, naval and air attaché in Washington, D. C. and nonresidential in Ottawa (Canada).
In March 2013 he was head of the Bahraini delegation at the final United Nations Conference on the Arms Trade Treaty in New York.
In 2013 his rank was raised from lieutenant to colonel.

Decorations
 Freedom of Kuwait Medals (He received two of them.)
 Long Services Medal
 Hawar Medal
Freedom of Iraq Medal

References

1960 births
Living people
Ambassadors of Bahrain to the United States
Bahraini military personnel